Rémi Pelletier-Roy (born July 4, 1990) is a Canadian track and road cyclist. He competed at several international competitions, including UCI Track World Championships, 2011 and 2015 Pan American Games and 2014 Commonwealth Games. He won many international medals and World Cup podiums. He's also a professional rider for team Garneau-Quebecor.

References

External links

 Biography at Cycling Canada

1990 births
Living people
Canadian male cyclists
Commonwealth Games bronze medallists for Canada
Cyclists from Quebec
Cyclists at the 2011 Pan American Games
Cyclists at the 2014 Commonwealth Games
Cyclists at the 2015 Pan American Games
Sportspeople from Longueuil
Commonwealth Games medallists in cycling
Pan American Games medalists in cycling
Pan American Games bronze medalists for Canada
Medalists at the 2015 Pan American Games
Université Laval alumni
21st-century Canadian people
Medallists at the 2014 Commonwealth Games